Catley v Herbert [1988] 1 NZLR 606 is a cited case in New Zealand regarding whether a contract illegal under law, can be subsequently validated under the Illegal Contracts Act 1970.

Background
Catley and Herbert were joint shareholders in a company, and had agreed that Herbert would buy out Catley's shares. This sale entailed the selling of some of the company property in order to purchase his shares. The law saw this as financing the purchase of a company's own shares, which was illegal under section 62 of the Companies Act 1950.

As a result, Herbert refused to pay Catley, on the basis that to do so would be illegal. Catley sought validation of the contract in the court.

Held
Validation of the contract was ordered.

Footnote: This case is often discussed with NZI Bank Ltd v Euro-National Corp Ltd [1992] 3 NZLR 528, where a similar transaction that also contravened section 62(1) was not validated

References

New Zealand contract case law
1988 in New Zealand law
1988 in case law
Court of Appeal of New Zealand cases